The 14211 / 12 Agra Cantt New Delhi Intercity Express is an Express train belonging to Indian Railways - North Central Railway zone that runs between Agra Cantt and New Delhi in India.

It operates as train number 14211 from Agra Cantt to New Delhi and as train number 14212 in the reverse direction serving the states of Uttar Pradesh, Haryana & Delhi.

Coaches

The 14211 / 12 Agra Cantt New Delhi Intercity Express has 1 AC First Class cum AC 2 tier, 2 AC Chair Car, 15 Second Class seating, 4 General Unreserved & 2 EOG (End of Generating car) coaches. It does not carry a Pantry car coach.

As is customary with most train services in India, Coach Composition may be amended at the discretion of Indian Railways depending on demand.

Service

The 14211 Agra Cantt New Delhi Intercity Express covers the distance of 195 kilometres in 4 hours 20 mins (45.00 km/hr) & in 4 hours 25 mins as 14212 New Delhi Agra Cantt Intercity Express (44.15 km/hr).

As the average speed of the train is below , as per Indian Railways rules, its fare does not include a Superfast surcharge.

Route

The 14211 / 12 Agra Cantt New Delhi Intercity Express runs from Agra Cantt via Mathura Junction, Ballabgarh, Faridabad, Tughlakabad, Hazrat Nizamuddin to New Delhi.

Traction

As the entire route is fully electrified, a Kanpur based WAP 7 powers the train for its entire journey.

Timings

14211 Agra Cantt New Delhi Intercity Express leaves Agra Cantt on a daily basis at 06:00 hrs IST and reaches New Delhi at 10:20 hrs IST the same day.

14212 New Delhi Agra Cantt  Intercity Express leaves New Delhi on a daily basis at 17:35 hrs IST and reaches Agra Cantt at 22:05 hrs IST the same day.

Gallery

See also 

 Gatimaan Express
 Lucknow - Agra Cantt. Superfast Intercity Express

References 

 https://www.flickr.com/photos/43144819@N05/4444160922/
 https://www.youtube.com/watch?v=dPoBWAIAskM
 http://pib.nic.in/newsite/erelease.aspx?relid=87360
 http://www.flickriver.com/places/India/Uttar+Pradesh/Agra+Cantt/search/

External links

Rail transport in Delhi
Rail transport in Haryana
Intercity Express (Indian Railways) trains
Transport in Delhi
Trains from Agra